National Christian Foundation (NCF) is a US non-profit organization that assists donors in donating to charitable causes. NCF accepts non-cash assets (for example stocks, real estate, and business interests), and is the nation's largest provider of donor-advised funds focused primarily on Christian givers. Since 1982, NCF has granted over $14.5 billion to causes and charities.

History 

In 1982, Evangelical Christian author and entrepreneur Larry Burkett, financial advisor Ron Blue, and tax attorney Terry Parker founded the National Christian Foundation.

Headquartered in Alpharetta, Georgia, NCF began adding local offices throughout the United States in 2000. By 2018, NCF reported having 28 local offices in cities across the country including Dallas, Orlando, Chicago, and Seattle. These local offices are community-based and act as liaisons to the national organization.

In 2021, NCF distributed its fourteen billionth grant dollar to more than 71,000 charities since its founding. This accomplishment has led it to be ranked as the 6th largest non-profit organization in the United States.

Program 

NCF's primary operation, the Giving Fund (donor advised fund), works like a charitable savings account. Via an online dashboard, donors give various assets into the Fund, receive a tax deduction at the time of the gift, and recommend grants to their favorite charities. NCF accepts non-cash gifts such as stocks, real estate, and business interests. They also offer other giving options, such as Charitable Gift Annuities and the NCF Legacy Fund. 

NCF spends a portion of donations to fund the support activities necessary to be able to make those grants. NCF calculates the amount as a percentage of the donor's Fund balance (typically 1% or less each year), and, in the case of non-cash assets, a percentage of gift value (typically 5%, one time).

Criticism 
Like other donor-advised funds, there is lack of specificity in the source of the money and their specific target. Between 2015 and 2017, NCF distributed 56.1 million dollars to 23 organizations designated as hate groups by the Southern Poverty Law Center. Most of these organizations opposed LGBT rights, some were anti-immigrant and anti-Muslim.

References

External links 
National Christian Foundation official Website

Christian organizations established in the 20th century
Christian organizations established in 1980
Christian charities based in the United States
Charities based in Georgia (U.S. state)